Alberta Provincial Highway No. 897 is a highway in the province of Alberta, Canada. It runs south-north in two sections, from Highway 14 north of Edgerton to Highway 55 south of Cold Lake, then from Kingsway at the west CFB Cold Lake limits to where Township Road 651 would be, west of Cold Lake Provincial Park. The south section runs between Highway 17 and Highway 41, the north section offers a route to resorts and vacation spots north of Cold Lake.

Major intersections 
Starting from the south end of Highway 897:

References 

897